Pachybolidae, is a family of Round-backed millipedes of the order Spirobolida. The family includes 49 different genera. Two subfamilies recognized.

Subfamilies
Pachybolinae 
Spiromiminae

Genera
 
Alluviobolus
Aphistogoniulus
?Atlanticobolus
Atopochetus
Aulacobolus
Brachyspirobolus
?Bukobolus
?Callipodolus
Caprobolus
Centrobolus
Colossobolus
Corallobolus
Crurifarcimen
?Dactylobolus
Dekanbolus
?Diaphoropus
Dichromatobolus
Epibolus
Epitrigoniulus
Erythroprosopon
Eucentrobolus
Flagellobolus
Gabolus
Granitobolus
Hadrobolus
Hyperbolus
Komphobolus
Litostrophus
Madabolus
Metiche
Microbolus
?Microspirobolus
Mystalides
Neptunobolus
Ostinobolus
Pachybolus
Parabolus
Pelmatojulus
Pseudocentrobolus
Riotintobolus
Sanguinobolus
?Spiromanes
Spiromimus
Stenobolus
Titsonobolus
Tonkinbolus
Trachelomegalus
Xenobolus
Zehntnerobolus

References

East African giant millipedes of the tribe Pachybolini (Diplopoda, Spirobolida, Pachybolidae)
Revision of the millipede subfamily Spiromiminae, a Malagasy group with Indian connections? (Diplopoda Spirobolida Pachybolidae)
Review of the Spirobolida on Madagascar, with descriptions of twelve new genera, including three genera of 'fire millipedes' (Diplopoda).

Spirobolida
Millipede families